Alex Serdyukov (born May 24, 1980) is a retired Russian mixed martial artist who competed in the Welterweight division. A professional from 2003 until 2009, he competed for the WEC and Palace Fighting Championship.

Championships and accomplishments
World Extreme Cagefighting
WEC North American Welterweight Championship (One time)

Mixed martial arts record

|-
| Loss
| align=center| 8-5
| Johny Hendricks
| Decision (unanimous)
| WEC 39
| 
| align=center| 3
| align=center| 5:00
| Corpus Christi, Texas, United States
| 
|-
| Win
| align=center| 8-4
| Luis Santos
| TKO (corner stoppage)
| WEC 34: Faber vs. Pulver
| 
| align=center| 1
| align=center| 5:00
| Sacramento, California, United States
| 
|-
| Win
| align=center| 7-4
| Ryan Stonitsch
| Submission (triangle choke)
| WEC 33: Marshall vs. Stann
| 
| align=center| 1
| align=center| 1:15
| Las Vegas, Nevada, United States
| 
|-
| Win
| align=center| 6-4
| Mike Gates
| TKO (punches)
| PFC 6: No Retreat, No Surrender
| 
| align=center| 2
| align=center| 2:05
| Lemoore, California, United States
| 
|-
| Loss
| align=center| 5-4
| John Alessio
| Submission (guillotine choke)
| WEC 28
| 
| align=center| 1
| align=center| 1:17
| Las Vegas, Nevada, United States
| 
|-
| Win
| align=center| 5-3
| Scott Norton
| Submission (guillotine choke)
| WEC 26: Condit vs. Alessio
| 
| align=center| 2
| align=center| 0:57
| Las Vegas, Nevada, United States
| 
|-
| Loss
| align=center| 4-3
| John Alessio
| Submission (rear naked choke)
| WEC 23: Hot August Fights
| 
| align=center| 3
| align=center| 1:52
| Lemoore, California, United States
| 
|-
| Loss
| align=center| 4-2
| Brian Ebersole
| Decision (unanimous)
| ICFO 1: Stockton
| 
| align=center| 3
| align=center| 5:00
| Stockton, California, United States
| 
|-
| Win
| align=center| 4-1
| Victor Parfenov
| TKO (punches)
| WEC 16
| 
| align=center| 1
| align=center| 2:20
| Lemoore, California, United States
| 
|-
| Win
| align=center| 3-1
| Mark Weir
| Submission (arm triangle choke) 
| WEC 14
| 
| align=center| 3
| align=center| 2:56
| Lemoore, California, United States
| 
|-
| Loss
| align=center| 2-1
| Jon Fitch
| TKO (punches)
| MMA Mexico: Day 1
| 
| align=center| 2
| align=center| 2:15
| Juarez, Mexico
| 
|-
| Win
| align=center| 2-0
| Miguel Gutierrez
| Decision (unanimous)
| MMA Mexico: Day 1
| 
| align=center| 3
| align=center| 5:00
| Juarez, Mexico
| 
|-
| Win
| align=center| 1-0
| Harris Sarmiento
| Submission (kimura) 
| KFC 2: Kaos Fighting Championships 2
| 
| align=center| 1
| align=center| N/A
| Honolulu, Hawaii, United States
|

References

External links 

Alex Serdyukov's WEC profile

1980 births
Living people
Martial artists from Moscow
Russian male mixed martial artists
Welterweight mixed martial artists
Mixed martial artists utilizing Muay Thai
Russian Muay Thai practitioners
Russian expatriates in the United States